Belarus State Economic University is a university in Minsk, Belarus. It specializes in Finance and Economics. It was founded in 1933 as Belarusian Institute for National Economy. It was renamed Belarus State Economic University (BSEU) in January 1992. In 1997, the university was officially given the status of a leading educational institution in preparing specialists in the field of economics.

Structure 
The university currently has 11 faculties, Special Faculty of Psycho-Pedagogical Training and Professional Development, Bobruisk University Branch, Institute for Social and Humanities Education, 65 departments, student scientific research laboratories and other units.

Faculties 
 Faculty of Marketing and Logistics
 Faculty of Management
 Faculty of International Economic Relations
 Faculty of Law
 Faculty of Accounting and Economics
 Faculty of Banking and Finance
 Faculty of Economy and Trade Management
 Faculty of International Business Communication
 Higher School of Business and Management
 Faculty of Commerce and Tourism Industry
 Faculty of Pre-university Training

International cooperation 
The university has close contacts with such international educational organizations as the US Embassy, International Research & Exchanges Board (IREX), British Council, German Academic Exchange Service (DAAD) and others.

Ranking 
According to the "UniPage world university ranking," the Belarus State Economic University is ranked 2228 in the world.

Prominent alumni 
Mikhail Golosov - Homer J. Livingston professor of economics at the University of Chicago.
Aleh Tsyvinski - Arthur M. Okun professor of economics at Yale University.

Criticism, accusations of political repressions
In late 2005, Tatsiana Khoma, a fourth-year A-student of the International Economic Relations Faculty, was expelled from the BSEU after participating in a conference of ESIB, a pan-European student organization, where she was elected member of the organization's leadership. The expulsion caused wide international protest and concerns from Sweden's education minister Leif Pagrotsky. The European University Association has frozen its cooperation with the BSEU following the scandal. BSEU students close to Tatsiana Khoma and those involved in civic activities were intimidated by the university's administration and the KGB.

In 2006, after mass protests against president Lukashenka that followed a controversial presidential election, BSEU students that were identified among protesters were forced, under threat of expulsion, to publicly repent and denounce the protests.

In 2008, human rights organisations have added BSEU rector Uladzimir Shymau (Vladimir Shimov) to a list of officials of the regime of president Alexander Lukashenko responsible for human rights violations. Shymau was listed among rectors of several universities from where students were expelled on political grounds.

In 2020, during the mass protests that followed another presidential election, the administration of the BSEU has reportedly filed a list of the university's students who participated in the protests to the police and requested measures to be taken against them. Several students were expelled from BSEU for participating in protests. The dean of one of the faculties was fired for expressing his political opinion and protecting student protesters.

On 21 June 2021, Siarhei Skryba, Vice Chancellor of the BSEU for Educational Work, was added to the sanctions list of the European Union. According to the official decision of the EU, "in his position as Vice Chancellor of the Belarusian State Economic University (BSEU) for educational work, Siarhei Skryba is responsible for sanctions taken against students for their participation in peaceful protests, including their expulsion from university. Some of these sanctions were taken following Lukashenka's call on 27 October 2020 for expelling from universities students taking part in protests and strikes."

References

External links

 Belarus State Economic University
 Department of Marketing and Logistics
 Faculty of Commerce and  Tourism Industry

 
Educational institutions established in 1933
1933 establishments in Belarus